Jade Mountain Illustrating the Gathering of Scholars at the Lanting Pavilion is a jade sculpture, made and most likely finished in 1790, in China. It measures 57.2 cm high, 290.3 cm long, and 97.7 cm deep. This carving is from the Qing dynasty.

History 

This piece was made in 1790 during the Qing dynasty, which reigned from 1644 to 1912 and was the final imperial dynasty. It was made under the fifth emperor of the dynasty, Qianlong, who commissioned this sculpture, which “remains the largest jade carving outside of China”. During this period, China was deeply steeped in a respect for tradition. Over the years, society in China grew to be more conservative. Art was just as much about politics as it was about the opportunity to depict the beauty of creation. According to the Minneapolis Institute of Art catalog, the sculpture was at some point taken out of China. It was brought to the United States by the diplomat Herbert G. Squiers. After Squiers' death, his possessions, along with the jade sculpture, were auctioned off. In 1912, Thomas Barlow Walker (1840–1928), the founder of the Walker Art Center, bought Jade Mountain at the auction for US $4,000 (the equivalent of $133,000 in 2022). According to the catalog, it was one of his most prized possessions, and for many years a centerpiece in his house. Tim Gihring describes a photograph of the Jade Mountain so used: “Undated photograph, likely from around 1915, shows the sculpture atop a tablecloth, surrounded by dinnerware and flowers.” According to Gihring, Walker started Minnesota’s first art gallery in his own home, and this jade carving was next displayed there. In fact, Walker had an entire salon just for jade alone, where Jade Mountain was displayed among many other pieces. He was an avid collector of Asian art and sought to share his collection with his community. Much of the art that Walker had collected over his lifetime eventually became part of “Mia” (the Minneapolis Institute of Art), including Jade Mountain.

Description of Jade Mountain 
The Jade Mountain sculpture is a large, oddly shaped piece of jade, with almost jagged edges. This is a sculpture in the round, meaning every part of the stone has been carefully carved. The center is covered in Chinese writing, as well as what looks like the royal seal. The sculpture appears to depict a mountain, including trees and a stream running along the bottom of the sculpture. It also includes what looks like a pagoda with little human figures that may be praying, depicting a scene from Asian culture. On the right of the carving, men in a circle may be praying or meditating. At a higher point on the mountain, there are some steps leading down to the river. By the river, there appear to be two men, one with a pointed stick, under some willow or pine trees. To the left and right there are more men who are talking or praying beside the river. On the far left, there seem to be men and perhaps women, who may be hugging or kissing.

Spirit of Jade Mountain 

Jade has historically been used in much Chinese, Japanese, and Korean art. Jade has long been very important to Chinese culture, with multiple symbolic meanings. According to the Minneapolis Institute of Art, it represents “tranquility and harmony of otherworldliness and the longing of the cultivated individual to escape the mundane world to commune with nature.” In Chinese culture jade represents purity, beauty, longevity, and immortality. Historically, jade was thought to have magical properties and was believed to grant its owner immortality. Jade was hard to find in China, and its rarity may help explain its popularity as a gemstone. Expert carvers were also rare, as working with jade was a very challenging and specialized skill. As a result, jade carvings were a sign of wealth and status.

Poem 
This jade carving depicts a famous scene in Qing Dynasty history. In its center, it tells the story about a historical event called the Spring Purification Festival, which during the Qing dynasty took place on the third day of the third lunar calendar month. A group of people (most likely nobles and wealthy people) would go out to enjoy nature by the river. This was a day for fun as well as celebration, enjoying meals by the water. At some point, the people would dip their hands in the water to help prevent bad luck. It is said that during one of these celebrations, a very memorable event occurred. There was a “drinking contest”, when people sent wine goblets floating down the winding creek, everyone cheering along on the bank. Whenever a cup stopped, the man closest to the cup was required to drink it and then write a poem. According to event records, 36 poems were composed. To commemorate this day, the calligrapher Wang Xizhi wrote an introduction to the poems collected on the Jade Mountain carving. Wang was particularly renowned for his cursive script and was also a highly esteemed scholar of the time. According to the Minneapolis catalog, 41 scholars along with Wang went to this festival. The festival and the poems created during this event helped inspire many scholars and artists alike.

The calligraphy 

According to the Minneapolis Institute of Art, some of the Chinese writing on this carving translates to this:

This lump of jade from Khotan was large, it was carved to illustrate a gathering at the Spring Purification Festival. Elders and youth alike congregated at this literary meeting, it was in the Yonghe reign, and the final month of spring. Often the calligraphy [of Lanting Xu] is scrutinized over its authenticity, I enjoy the genuineness of the picture of jade. One cannot help but ask, among those depicted in the scene, who is worthy of the name ‘jade being’?

This text was written by the Qianlong Emperor, who chose a jade carving because China was seen as old and hard as jade, as well as strong and powerful. The poem on this sculpture was published not just on the carving but also in a collection of poems and essays. The emperor was happy to see the symbolism of the jade carving, done in part to celebrate his 80th birthday. The jade carving could have been seen as a statement that the emperor’s reign was almost immortal.  Something unique to Chinese art is that an art work often includes text that explains its significance. This is written in semi-cursive script. The jade carvings script explains that Jade Mountain depicts a scene from the city of Shaoxing.

Text translation 
This translation of the text describes the events of the Orchid Pavilion Gathering and is in  the documents from the Orchid Pavilion Gathering. The text is written by Lantingji Xu and is a rare example of poems of the time, as well as of how Chinese text looked like back then. By reading Xu and the Emperor’s text, we can get an idea of how the festival worked and what it looked like.

Pieces inspired by Lanting Pavilion 
Jade Mountain was created in honor of the Orchid Pavilion Gathering, an event that inspired many poets and artists of the time and continued to inspire Chinese poets, artists, philosophers and scholars for many generations to come. Besides Jade Mountain Illustrating the Gathering of Scholars at the Lanting Pavilion, other works made after this event include Gathering at the Orchid Pavilion, Xiao Yi Trying to Swipe the Lanting Scroll, Song, Juran – Xiao Getting the Orchid Pavilion Scroll and Wang Xizhi's Lantingji Xu by Feng Chengsu (馮承素),

Bibliography 

1790s sculptures
Hardstone carving
Jade
Qing dynasty art
Sculptures in Minnesota
Wikipedia Student Program